Lucas Mazzo (born 19 May 1994) is a Brazilian racewalking athlete. He represented Brazil at the 2020 Summer Olympics in the men's 20 kilometres walk.

Career
Mazzo represented Brazil at the 2021 South American Championships in the 20,000 meters walk and finished in fifth place with a time of 1:28:26.92. He then represented Brazil at the 2020 Summer Olympics in the men's 20 kilometres walk, and did not finish.

References

1994 births
Living people
Brazilian male racewalkers
Athletes (track and field) at the 2020 Summer Olympics
Olympic athletes of Brazil
Sportspeople from Belém